Bunsen Peak el.  is a prominent peak due south of Mammoth Hot Springs in Yellowstone National Park, Wyoming.  The peak lies on the east flank of Kingman Pass on the Mammoth to Norris section of the Grand Loop Road. The peak was first ascended by Ferdinand V. Hayden and Captain John W. Barlow in 1871, Bunsen Peak was not named until 1872 during the second Hayden Geologic Survey.  E. S. Topping named the peak Observation Mountain in 1872 as well, but that name did not stick. The Bunsen Peak Trail with its trailhead just south of Mammoth is a steep  to the summit.  Bunsen Peak was named for the German chemist Robert Bunsen, the inventor of the Bunsen Burner and responsible for early work on volcanic geyser theories.

See also
Mountains and mountain ranges of Yellowstone National Park

Notes

Mountains of Yellowstone National Park
Mountains of Wyoming
Mountains of Park County, Wyoming